New York Times Co. v. Sullivan, 376 U.S. 254 (1964), was a landmark U.S. Supreme Court decision ruling that the First Amendment to the U.S. Constitution's freedom of speech protections limit the ability of American public officials to sue for defamation. The decision held that if a plaintiff in a defamation lawsuit is a public official or candidate for public office, not only must they prove the normal elements of defamationpublication of a false defamatory statement to a third partythey must also prove that the statement was made with "actual malice", meaning the defendant either knew the statement was false or recklessly disregarded whether it might be false. New York Times Co. v. Sullivan is frequently ranked as one of the greatest Supreme Court decisions of the modern era.

The underlying case began in 1960, when The New York Times published a full-page advertisement by supporters of Martin Luther King Jr. that criticized the police in Montgomery, Alabama, for their treatment of civil rights movement protesters. The ad had several inaccuracies regarding facts such as the number of times King had been arrested during the protests, what song the protesters had sung, and whether students had been expelled for participating. Based on the inaccuracies, Montgomery police commissioner L. B. Sullivan sued the Times for defamation in the local Alabama county court. After the judge ruled that the advertisement's inaccuracies were defamatory per se, the jury returned a verdict in favor of Sullivan and awarded him $500,000 in damages. The Times appealed first to the Supreme Court of Alabama, which affirmed the verdict, and then to the U.S. Supreme Court, which agreed to hear the case.

In March 1964, the Court issued a 9–0 decision holding that the Alabama court's verdict violated the First Amendment. The decision defended free reporting of the civil rights movement campaigns in the southern United States. It is one of the key decisions supporting the freedom of the press. Before this decision, there were nearly $300 million in libel actions from the southern states outstanding against news organizations, part of a collective effort by southern officials to use defamation suits to prevent critical coverage of civil-rights issues in out-of-state publications. The Supreme Court's decision, and its adoption of the actual malice standard, reduced the financial exposure from potential defamation claims and frustrated efforts by public officials to use these claims to suppress political criticism. In later decisions, beginning with Curtis Publishing Co. v. Butts, the Supreme Court has extended Sullivan higher legal standard for defamation from public officials to all "public figures". These decisions have made it extremely difficult for a public figure to win a defamation lawsuit in the United States.

Background
On March 29, 1960, The New York Times carried a full-page advertisement titled "Heed Their Rising Voices", paid for by the Committee to Defend Martin Luther King and the Struggle for Freedom in the South. In the advertisement, the Committee solicited funds to defend Martin Luther King Jr., against an Alabama perjury indictment. The advertisement described actions against civil rights protesters, some of them inaccurately, some of which involved the police force of Montgomery, Alabama. Referring to Alabama "official authority and police power", the advertisement stated: "They have arrested [King] seven times. ... ", whereas he had been arrested four times; and that "truckloads of police ... ringed the Alabama State College Campus" after the demonstration at the State Capitol, whereas the police had been "deployed near" the campus but had not actually "ringed" it and had not gone there in connection with the State Capitol demonstration. Although the Montgomery Public Safety commissioner, L. B. Sullivan, was not named in the advertisement, Sullivan argued that the inaccurate criticism of actions by the police was defamatory to him as well because it was his duty to supervise the police department.

Because Alabama law denied public officers recovery of punitive damages in a libel action on their official conduct unless they first made a written demand for a public retraction and the defendant failed or refused to comply, Sullivan sent such a request. The Times did not publish a retraction in response to the demand. Instead, its lawyers wrote a letter stating, among other things, that "we ... are somewhat puzzled as to how you think the statements in any way reflect on you," and "you might, if you desire, let us know in what respect you claim that the statements in the advertisement reflect on you."

Sullivan did not respond but instead filed a libel suit a few days later. He also sued four African-American ministers mentioned in the ad: Ralph Abernathy, S.S. Seay, Sr., Fred Shuttlesworth, and Joseph Lowery.

The Times subsequently published a retraction of the advertisement upon the demand of Governor John Patterson of Alabama, who alleged the publication charged him with "grave misconduct and ... improper actions and omissions as Governor of Alabama and ex officio chairman of the State Board of Education of Alabama." When asked to explain why there had been a retraction for the Governor but not for Sullivan, the Secretary of the Times testified:
We did that because we didn't want anything that was published by the Times to be a reflection on the State of Alabama and the Governor was, as far as we could see, the embodiment of the State of Alabama and the proper representative of the state and we had by that time learned more of the facts which the ad purported to recite and, finally, the ad did refer to the action of the state authorities and the Board of Education presumably of which the Governor is the ex officio chairman ... 
However, the Secretary also testified he did not think that "any of the languages in there referred to Mr. Sullivan."

Sullivan secured a judgment for $500,000 in the Alabama state trial court. The state supreme court affirmed on August 30, 1962, saying "The First Amendment of the U.S. Constitution does not protect libelous publications". The Times appealed to the United States Supreme Court.

Constitutional law scholar Herbert Wechsler successfully argued the case before the United States Supreme Court. Louis M. Loeb, a partner at the firm of Lord Day & Lord who served as chief counsel to the Times from 1948 to 1967, was among the authors of the brief of the Times.

Decision
On March 9, 1964, the Supreme Court issued a unanimous 9–0 decision in favor of the Times that vacated the Alabama court's judgment and limited newspapers' liability for damages in defamation suits by public officials.

Opinion of the Court

Justice William J. Brennan Jr. authored the Court's opinion, and five other justices joined it. The Court began by explaining that criticism of government and public officials was at the core of the American constitutional rights to freedom of speech and freedom of the press. 

The Court said that because of these core American principles, it would "consider this case against the background of a profound national commitment to the principle that debate on public issues should be uninhibited, robust, and wide-open, and that it may well include vehement, caustic, and sometimes unpleasantly sharp attacks on government and public officials."

With this background, the Court framed the case around the question of whether this American constitutional commitment to free speech required loosening traditional defamation laws.

In answer, the Court held that the advertisement's inaccuracies did not remove its free-speech constitutional protections. The Court reasoned that "erroneous statement is inevitable in free debate, and ... must be protected if the freedoms of expression are to have the breathing space that they need ... to survive". It concluded that the importance of safeguarding the "breathing space" created by the First Amendment's protections required giving constitutional protection to "erroneous statements honestly made". The Court analogized Alabama's libel law to the infamous Alien and Sedition Acts passed in the late 1790s during the presidency of John Adams. It reasoned that a broad interpretation of libel laws that protected government officials from criticism would produce situations similar to those under the Alien and Sedition Acts, which had been historically criticized.

Because of the importance of free debate about public officials, the Court held that it was not enough that Alabama's libel law—like most libel laws in the English common law tradition—allowed defendants to use the truth of their defamatory statements as a defense. Instead, the Court held that under U.S. law, any public official suing for defamation must prove that the defendant made the defamatory statement with "actual malice".

The Court said that besides proving "actual malice", the First Amendment's protections also imposed two other limitations on libel laws. First, a public official seeking damages must prove that the defendant's defamatory statement was about the official individually, not about government policy generally. Second, unlike in traditional common law defamation lawsuits where the defendant had the burden to prove that his or her statement was true, in defamation suits involving American public officials the officials must prove that the defendant's statement was false.

International comparisons
The rule that somebody alleging defamation should have to prove untruth, rather than that the defendant should have to prove the truth of a statement, stood as a departure from the previous common law. In England, the development was specifically rejected in Derbyshire County Council v. Times Newspapers Ltd and it was also rejected in Canada in Hill v. Church of Scientology of Toronto and more recently in Grant v. Torstar Corp.  In Australia, the outcome of the case was followed in Theophanous v. The Herald & Weekly Times Ltd, but Theophanous was itself overruled by the High Court of Australia in Lange v Australian Broadcasting Corporation (1997) 189 CLR 520.

50th anniversary
In 2014, on the 50th anniversary of the ruling, The New York Times released an editorial in which it stated the background of the case, laid out the rationale for the Supreme Court decision, critically reflected on the state of freedom of the press 50 years after the ruling and compared the state of freedom of the press in the United States with other nations. The editorial board of The New York Times heralded the Sullivan decision not only as a ruling which "instantly changed libel law in the United States", but also as "the clearest and most forceful defense of press freedom in American history." The board added:

In a 2015 TIME Magazine survey of over 50 law professors, both Owen Fiss (Yale) and Steven Schiffrin (Cornell) named New York Times v. Sullivan "the best Supreme Court decision since 1960," with Fiss noting that the decision helped cement "the free-speech traditions that have ensured the vibrancy of American democracy" and Schiffrin remarking that the case "overturned the censorial aspects of the law of libel and made it far easier in what’s left of our democracy for citizens—including the Fourth Estate—to criticize the powerful."

Later developments
Curtis Publishing Co. v. Butts, 388 U.S. 130 (1967) held that public figures who are not public officials may still sue news organizations if they disseminate information about them which is recklessly gathered and unchecked.
Gertz v. Robert Welch, Inc., 418 U.S. 323 (1974): Actual malice not necessary for defamation of private person if negligence is present.
 Time, Inc. v. Hill, 385 U.S. 374 (1967). Extension of actual malice standard to false light invasion of privacy tort.
Hustler Magazine v. Falwell, 485 U.S. 46 (1988): Extending standard to intentional infliction of emotional distress.
Milkovich v. Lorain Journal Co., 497 U.S. 1 (1990): Existing law is sufficient to protect free speech without recognizing opinion privilege against libel claims.

Further developments
In February 2019, the Supreme Court denied a petition brought by Katherine McKee, one of the women that accused Bill Cosby of sexual assault, which claimed that Cosby had leaked a letter that permanently damaged her reputation, and had sought civil action against Cosby on this matter. Lower courts rejected her case based on New York Times Co., stating that she "thrust herself to the forefront of a public controversy", making her a limited public figure and requiring the higher standard of malice to be demonstrated. The denial by the Supreme Court did not include a vote count, but Justice Clarence Thomas wrote the solitary opinion on the case, agreeing that denial was appropriate per New York Times Co., but stating that he believed that decision of New York Times Co. was made wrongly. Thomas wrote "If the Constitution does not require public figures to satisfy an actual-malice standard in state-law defamation suits, then neither should we".

In March 2021, federal judge Laurence Silberman called on the Supreme Court to overturn New York Times v. Sullivan, stating that the New York Times and The Washington Post are "virtually Democratic Party broadsheets". Silberman's dissent also accused big tech companies of censoring conservatives and warned that "Democratic Party ideological control" of mainstream media may be a prelude to an "authoritarian or dictatorial regime" that constitutes "a threat to a viable democracy".

Judge Silberman's dissent produced significant public discussion of Sullivan and potential reforms. Many conservative-leaning outlets endorsed Silberman's criticisms of Sullivan. Most liberal-leaning outlets and several moderate conservatives condemned Silberman's decision for its tone and the substantive idea of loosening defamation standards. However, some liberal scholars and a Harvard Law student writing in the Wall Street Journal embraced significant reforms to Sullivan.

In the July 2021 denial of certiorari in Berisha v. Lawson, Justice Thomas dissented and reiterated his opposition to New York Times v. Sullivan. Justice Neil Gorsuch also questioned the usefulness of NYT v. Sullivan when applied to today's media and social media.

See also
 New York Times Co. v. United States (1971)
 New York Times Co. v. Tasini (2001)
 List of United States Supreme Court cases, volume 376

References

Footnotes

Citations

Works cited

Further reading

 Edmondson, Aimee. "Rearticulating New York Times v. Sullivan as a Social Duty to Journalists", Journalism Studies 18, no. 1 (Jan 2017): 86-101. response to Donald Trump's campaign promise to " "open up" libel laws to make it easier for officeholders to sue the media.

 Smolla, Rodney A. Suing the Press: Libel, the Media, and Power. NY: Oxford University Press, 1986.

External links

Booknotes interview with Anthony Lewis on Make No Law: The Sullivan Case and the First Amendment, October 20, 1991.

1964 in United States case law
United States defamation case law
United States Supreme Court cases
United States Free Speech Clause case law
History of mass media in the United States
United States tort case law
The New York Times
American Civil Liberties Union litigation
Civil rights movement case law
African-American history of Alabama
United States Supreme Court cases of the Warren Court